In enzymology, a 1D-1-guanidino-3-amino-1,3-dideoxy-scyllo-inositol transaminase is an enzyme that catalyzes the chemical reaction

1D-1-guanidino-3-amino-1,3-dideoxy-scyllo-inositol + pyruvate  1D-1-guanidino-1-deoxy-3-dehydro-scyllo-inositol + L-alanine

Thus, the two substrates of this enzyme are 1D-1-guanidino-3-amino-1,3-dideoxy-scyllo-inositol and pyruvate, whereas its two products are 1D-1-guanidino-1-deoxy-3-dehydro-scyllo-inositol and L-alanine.

This enzyme belongs to the family of transferases, specifically the transaminases, which transfer nitrogenous groups.  The systematic name of this enzyme class is 1D-1-guanidino-3-amino-1,3-dideoxy-scyllo-inositol:pyruvate aminotransferase. Other names in common use include guanidinoaminodideoxy-scyllo-inositol-pyruvate aminotransferase, and L-alanine-N-amidino-3-(or 5-)keto-scyllo-inosamine transaminase.

References

 
 
 

EC 2.6.1
Enzymes of unknown structure